Lactarius flexuosus is a species of fungus in the mushroom family Russulaceae. The cap of L. flexuosus can reach  in diameter. The mushroom is edible when pickled and boiled.

References

flexuosus
Fungi described in 1801
Fungi of Europe
Taxa named by Christiaan Hendrik Persoon